Maja Joščak (born 4 August 1990) is a Croatian football forward, who plays for ŽNK Osijek.

International career 
She was part of the U19 national team, and a member of the Croatia women's national football team.

Honours 
Osijek
Winner
 Croatian First Division (5): 2010–11, 2011–12, 2012–13, 2013–14, 2014–15

External links 
 
 
 

1990 births
Living people
Croatian women's footballers
Croatia women's international footballers
Women's association football forwards
Croatian Women's First Football League players
ŽNK Osijek players